John Pollock Eadon (3 September 1889 – 1961) was a Scottish professional footballer who played for Maryhill, Tottenham Hotspur, Albion Rovers, Ayr United, Dumbarton, Morton and Johnstone.

Football career 
Eadon began his career with local club Maryhill. The goalkeeper joined Tottenham Hotspur and played five matches in 1915.

References 

1889 births
1961 deaths
Footballers from Glasgow
Scottish footballers
Association football goalkeepers
English Football League players
Scottish Football League players
Maryhill F.C. players
Tottenham Hotspur F.C. players
Albion Rovers F.C. players
Ayr United F.C. players
Dumbarton F.C. players
Greenock Morton F.C. players
Johnstone F.C. players